Mary Willoughby may refer to:

 Mary Willoughby, Baroness Willoughby, or Mary, married name Willoughby
English ship Mary Willoughby, named after the above